Dewan Farooque Motors Limited is a Pakistani automobile manufacturer based in Karachi, Pakistan. The major activities by the company are assembling, manufacturing and sale of vehicles.

In 2016, the company agreed to resume production of vehicles of Indian multinational Mahindra & Mahindra's  South Korea based subsidiary SsangYong, as Daehan-Dewan at its assembly plant in Sujawal.

History
Dewan Farooque Motors Limited was incorporated on 28 December 1998.

Dewan Farooque partnered with Korean brands like Hyundai and Kia to produce its first car on January 15, 2000. The company received an extraordinary response especially for its Hyundai Santro and Hyundai Shahzore models. Company sales grew well until 2008 when it faced various challenges. In 2009, automobile production stopped. After a gap of three years, Dewan Farooque Motors produced a few hundred cars in fiscal year 2014 and 2015 based on its old inventory. Dewan Farooque Motors in October 2016 announced that the company would start assembling vehicles in 2017 again.

On 19 January 2018, Dewan Farooque Motors announced it has received approval for its Brownfield plant from the Engineering Development Board and is expected to resume vehicle production from February 2018. On February 25, 2018 Dewan launched a cargo pickup truck under the popular Shehzore nameplate in collaboration with Daehan Motors (Vietnam).

The market capital of the company is PKR 579,913,310. The free float is 40%. They are currently showing as a defaulter in Pakistan Stock Exchange  which means they are not doing well in Business.

Products
 Shehzore (Light Utility Truck)

See also 
Yousuf Dewan Companies

References

Car manufacturers of Pakistan
Truck manufacturers of Pakistan
Vehicle manufacturing companies established in 2000
Vehicle manufacturing companies disestablished in 2019
Companies listed on the Pakistan Stock Exchange
Pakistani companies established in 2000
Pakistani companies disestablished in 2019
Manufacturing companies based in Karachi